Badamak (also Romanized as Bādāmak; also known as Gowharīyeh (Persian: گوهريه), Gabarhāy and Gowharī) is a village in Gavkan Rural District, in the Central District of Rigan County, Kerman Province, Iran. At the 2006 census, its population was 158, in 25 families.

References 

Populated places in Rigan County